Deniz Barış (born 2 July 1977) is a Turkish former professional footballer who played as a defensive midfielder or centre-back.

Career
Born in Kemah, Turkey, Barış played for SV Este 06/70 in his youth. He had an important role when FC St. Pauli was promoted to the Bundesliga in 2001.

After his years at St. Pauli, he attracted the attention of the Gençlerbirliği chairman İlhan Cavcav and he was transferred to Gençlerbirliği. In Gençlerbirliği's UEFA Cup campaign, he was one of the most influential players of the team. His team defeated European clubs such as Blackburn Rovers and Sporting CP.

In 2004, Fenerbahçe's chairman signed Barış to his team paying one of the Gençlerbirliği's record transfer fees.

Barış was a member of the Turkey national team's squad at the 2003 FIFA Confederations Cup.

Personal life
Due to a financial problem in his transfer to Fenerbahçe, Barış's licence was suspended and he was unable to play for the Kadıköy side for a long time.

In July 2006, he lost his childhood love and mother of his two children Frauke Barış in a tragic house accident in his house in Jork near Hamburg, Germany. During their match following this event, F.C. St. Pauli players wore black armbands to express their sorrow for the ex-St. Pauli player.

Honours
Fenerbahçe
Süper Lig: 2004–05, 2006–07
Süper Kupa: 2007

Turkey
FIFA Confederations Cup: third place: 2003

References

External links

 Deniz Barış at TFF.org 
 
 

1977 births
Living people
People from Kemah, Erzincan
Turkish footballers
Association football midfielders
Association football defenders
Turkey international footballers
2003 FIFA Confederations Cup players
FC St. Pauli players
Gençlerbirliği S.K. footballers
Fenerbahçe S.K. footballers
Antalyaspor footballers
Süper Lig players
Bundesliga players
2. Bundesliga players
Turkish expatriate footballers
Turkish expatriate sportspeople in Germany
Expatriate footballers in Germany